The 2017 VOO-Tour de Wallonie was a five-stage men's professional road cycling race, held in Belgium as a 2.HC race on the 2017 UCI Europe Tour. It was the forty-fourth running of the Tour de Wallonie, starting on 22 July in Stavelot and finishing on 26 July in Thuin.

The race was won by Belgian rider Dylan Teuns, winning two stages and the points classification alongside his overall success.

Schedule
The race route was announced on 4 May 2017.

Teams
Initially, 19 teams were selected to take part in Tour de Wallonie. Six of these were UCI WorldTeams, with ten UCI Professional Continental teams and three UCI Continental teams. A 20th team, Professional Continental team  were later added to the race.

Stages

Stage 1
22 July 2017 — Stavelot to Marchin,

Stage 2
23 July 2017 — Chaudfontaine to Seraing,

Stage 3
24 July 2017 — Arlon to Houffalize,

Stage 4
25 July 2017 — Brussels (Brussels Capital Region) to Profondeville,

Stage 5
26 July 2017 — Chièvres to Thuin,

Classification leadership table
In the 2017 Tour de Wallonie, five different jerseys were awarded. The general classification was calculated by adding each cyclist's finishing times on each stage, and allowing time bonuses for the first three finishers at intermediate sprints (three seconds to first, two seconds to second and one second to third) and at the finish of all stages to the first three finishers: the stage winner won a ten-second bonus, with six and four seconds for the second and third riders respectively. The leader of the classification received a yellow jersey; it was considered the most important of the 2017 Tour de Wallonie, and the winner of the classification was considered the winner of the race.

There was also a mountains classification, the leadership of which was marked by a white jersey. In the mountains classification, points towards the classification were won by reaching the top of a climb before other cyclists. Each climb was categorised as either first, or second-category, with more points available for the higher-categorised climbs.

Additionally, there was a points classification, which awarded a green jersey. In the points classification, cyclists received points for finishing in the top 10 in a stage. For winning a stage, a rider earned 25 points, with 20 for second, 15 for third, 10 for fourth and so on, down to 1 point for 10th place. There was also a separate classification for the intermediate sprints, rewarding a purple jersey. Points towards the classification were accrued – awarded on a 5–3–1 scale – at intermediate sprint points during each stage; these intermediate sprints also offered bonus seconds towards the general classification as noted above.

The fifth and final jersey represented the classification for young riders, marked by a red jersey. This was decided the same way as the general classification, but only riders born after 22 July 1993 were eligible to be ranked in the classification. This jersey was only awarded post-stage, and was not worn during the race. There was also a team classification, in which the times of the best three cyclists per team on each stage were added together; the leading team at the end of the race was the team with the lowest total time.

Notes

References

Sources

External links
  
 

2017
2017 UCI Europe Tour
2017 in Belgian sport